was a Japanese cinematographer during the 20th century. Notable works include Harakiri, The Human Condition trilogy, and Kwaidan.

Filmography
Utano yononaka (The Singing World) (1936)
Bushido orakanarishi (When the Bushido is Big-Hearted) (1936)
Nihon josei dokuhon (Japanese Women's Textbook) (1937)
Minamikaze no oka (Hill of the South Wind) (1937)
Edo no shirasagi (White Egret in Edo) (1937)
Kaminari oyaji (Tough Dad) (1937)
Jinsei Keiba (Life Is a Horse Race) (1938)
Katei niki (zen) (Family Diary, Part One) (1938)
Katei niki (go) (Family Diary, Part One) (1938) 
Den'en kôkyôgaku (Pastoral Symphony) (1939)
Uruwashiki shupatu (Beautiful Departure) (1939)
Machi (Town) (1939)
Roppa no shinkon ryoko (Roppa's Honeymoon) (1940)
Ribbon o musubu fujin (The Lady Ties a Ribbon) (1939)
Moyuru ozora (The Burning Sky) (1940)
Shidô monogatari (1941)
Ani no hanayome (A Brother's Bride) (1941)
Kaiketsu (The Solution) (1941)
Ano hata o ute (Fire on the Flag!) (1944)
War and Peace (Sensô to heiwa) (1947)
Onna no issho (1949)
And Yet We Live (Dokkoi ikiteru)(1951)
Boryoku (1952)
Mura hachibu (1953)
Kanikōsen (1953)
Before Dawn (Yoake mae) (1953) 
Wakai hitotachi (1954)
Ashizuri misaki (1954)
Aisureba koso  (1955) - (segment "1")
Ginza no onna (1955)
Bijo to kairyū (1955)
An Actress (Joyu) (1956)
Yellow Crow (Kiiroi karasu) (1957)
Umi no yarodomo (1957)
Hotarubi (1958)
Kisetsufu no kanatani (1958)
Naked Sun (1958)
The Human Condition I: No Greater Love (1959)
Karatachi nikki (1959)
The Human Condition II: Road to Eternity (1959)
Onna no saka (1960)
Lover Under the Crucifix (Ogin sama) (1960) 
The Human Condition III: A Soldier's Prayer (1961)
Harakiri (1962) 
Love Under the Crucifix (1962)
Kwaidan (1964)
Live Your Own Way (Wakamono tachi) (1967)
Zoku otoshimae (1968)
Forward Ever Forward (Wakamono wa yuku) (1969)
Empire of Passion (1978)
The Fall of Ako Castle (1978)
Shikake-nin Baian (1981)

Awards and nominations

References

External links
 

Japanese cinematographers
People from Nagano Prefecture
1909 births
1998 deaths